Haddaoui is an Arabic surname. Notable people with the surname include:

Surname
Anissa Haddaoui (born 1991), Dutch-Moroccan boxer, kickboxer, muay thai fighter and BJJ practitioner
Fethi Haddaoui, Tunisian actor, writer, director, and producer
Mouncif El Haddaoui (born 1964), Moroccan footballer
Mustafa El Haddaoui (born 1961), Moroccan footballer
Riffi Haddaoui (born 1971), Danish footballer

Middle name
Hammou Haddaoui Khadir (born 1936), Moroccan wrestler

Arabic-language surnames